(stylized Jägermeiſter) is a German digestif made with 56 herbs and spices. Developed in 1934 by Wilhelm and Curt Mast, it has an alcohol by volume of 35% (61 degrees proof, or US 70 proof). The recipe has not changed since its creation and continues to be served in its signature green glass bottle.

History
Wilhelm Mast was a vinegar manufacturer and wine trader in the city of Wolfenbüttel, Germany. His son, Curt Mast (1897–1970), was passionate about the production of spirits and liqueurs, and always keen to help his father in the business even at an early age. In 1934, at the age of 37, after he took over his father's business, Curt devised the recipe for "Jägermeister".

Curt was an enthusiastic hunter. The name Jägermeister in German literally means "Master Hunter", "Hunt Master", or "master of the hunt". It is a title for a high-ranking official in charge of matters related to hunting and gamekeeping. The term  had existed as a job title for many centuries. In 1934, the new  (Reich hunting law) redefined the term, applying it to senior foresters, game wardens, and gamekeepers in the German civil service.  was appointed  (Reich hunting master) when the new hunting law was introduced. Thus, when Jägermeister was introduced in 1935, its name was already familiar to Germans, who sometimes called the product "".

 came to greater international attention particularly through the work of Sidney Frank (1919–2006), who ran an American liquor importing company. From the 1980s, he promoted the drink in the youth and student market, as a drink for parties – a quite different niche to its traditional conservative brand position in its native German market. New York magazine quoted a market research firm describing him as "a promotional genius" for making "a liqueur with an unpronounceable name...drunk by older, blue-collar Germans as an after-dinner digestive aid... synonymous with 'party'." The  company ultimately purchased Sidney Frank Importing in 2015.

Composition
 is a type of liqueur called  (herbal liqueur). In contrast to those beverages,  has a sweeter taste.

's ingredients include 56 herbs, fruits, roots, and spices, including citrus peel, licorice, anise, poppy seeds, saffron, ginger, juniper berries, and ginseng. These ingredients are ground, then steeped in water and alcohol for two to three days. This mixture is filtered and stored in oak barrels for about a year. Then the liqueur is filtered again, and mixed with sugar, caramel and alcohol.

Contrary to a rumor that has circulated on the internet,  does not contain deer or elk blood.

Label

The label on Jägermeister bottles features a glowing Christian cross seen between the antlers of a stag. This image is a reference to the two Christian patron saints of hunters, Saint Hubertus and Saint Eustace, both of whom converted to Christianity after experiencing a vision in which they saw a Christian cross between the antlers of a stag.

In the product name on the label is one of the few surviving examples of the use of the long s in print.

The label contains the following verse from the poem , by the forester, hunter, and ornithologist ; von Riesenthal is not credited on the label.

It is the hunter's honour that he
Protects and preserves his game,
Hunts sportsmanlike, honours the
Creator in His creatures.

A loose translation which  preserves the rhyme and meter is:

This is the hunter's badge of glory,
That he protect and tend his quarry,
Hunt with honour, as is due,
And through the beast to God is true.

Cocktails

 A shot glass of  dropped into a glass of Red Bull energy drink makes a cocktail called a Jägerbomb.
 A Liquid Heroin is a shooter made with one part Rumple Minze, one part , and one part Bacardi 151 rum. Alternatively, A Liquid Cocaine is made with one part , one part , and one part Bacardi 151 rum.
 The Four Horsemen of the Apocalypse is a shot made with equal parts , Rumple Minze, and Bacardi 151.
 The Redheaded Slut, also known as a ginger bitch, is a cocktail made of Jägermeister, peach-flavored Schnapps, and cranberry juice.

Line extensions

Ready to drink 
In 2012  launched premixed drinks as a brand extension. The drinks come in two flavours, "raw" and "ginger lime".

Manifest 
In 2018  launched a premium line extension titled Manifest. The 38% ABV spirit is twice oak-aged and not to be served ice cold.

Karakter series 
In 2019  launched the first of its karakter series, Scharf, also known as  Hot Ginger.  Each extension in the karakter series was intended to highlight one of 's 56 signature herbs and spices. As of January 2021 no further extensions under the karakter series have been announced.

Jägermeister Cold Brew Coffee 
In 2019  launched  Cold Brew Coffee Liqueur, using its original recipe with fair trade coffee and cacao added.

Sponsorships

Sports
From the 1970s, the  brand has developed an association with motor racing, as they have sponsored various European racing teams, primarily those who fielded BMWs and Porsches.  These teams have competed in various major racing series including Formula One (March and EuroBrun), DRM (Max Moritz, Kremer, Zakspeed), DTM and Group C (Brun Motorsport), who took the team title in the 1986 World Sportscar Championship.

's orange livery is one of the more commonly recognised in motorsport. The Spanish Fly slot car brand has recently brought out model cars with the distinctive design. More recently, they introduced the Naylor Racing NHRA Pro Stock car, minus its signature orange livery. An article in the January 31, 2008, edition of Autosport listed the livery as one of the twenty most iconic commercial colour schemes.

In 1973,  became the first  team to place a sponsor's logo on its jersey, although the team rejected a related proposal to rename itself . The sponsorship, very controversial at the time, paid the team 100,000 DM (€51,130) and introduced a new way of doing business in football. Other teams quickly followed suit. Jägermeister now displays its advertisements at several football stadiums in Germany.

As of 2018 Jägermeister has sponsored the National Hockey League (NHL) as the official shot of the NHL.

Music

In the United States,  became popular through promotion by Sidney Frank and through its association with heavy metal and rock music bands such as Murphy's Law, Halestorm, Metallica, Mötley Crüe, Pantera, Slayer, HIM, Crossfaith, Epica, The Bloodhound Gang, Psychostick, and Turbonegro.  was the tour sponsor of numerous bands of this genre.

 has been a sponsor of the second stage at the Rockstar Mayhem Festival since 2008. Mayhem Fest is a large Hard rock and Modern metal festival that tours the United States and Canada. In 2008 the stage featured the bands Machine Head, Airbourne, Five Finger Death Punch and Walls of Jericho. The 2009 Mayhem Fest  Stage featured Trivium, All That Remains and God Forbid. The 2010 stage featured the bands Hatebreed, Chimaira, Shadows Fall and Winds of Plague. The 2011 stage featured Unearth, Kingdom of Sorrow, and Red Fang. The 2012 stage featured Anthrax, Asking Alexandria, and more.

The  Music Tour, which was owned by Sidney Frank Importing, was an event that was held each year in the spring and fall.

In Australia,  sponsors the AIR Charts, which are Australia's official independent music charts (run by the Australian Independent Record Labels Association).

In 2020  USA launched a program titled "Meister Class," an initiative to provide emerging musicians with insight from and access to established stars Mustard, Smino, and EarthGang.

On December 18, 2020 it was announced that  USA donated one million dollars to NIVA Emergency Relief Fund in support of venues struggling due to COVID-19.

Gallery

See also

Notes

References

External links

  in English
  in German
  for the United States

Anise liqueurs and spirits
Bitters
German liqueurs
Wolfenbüttel
German brands
German distilled drinks
Products introduced in 1935
Herbal liqueurs
German inventions of the Nazi period
1935 establishments in Germany